Matthew Ryan (born 15 September 1969) is an Australian former professional rugby league footballer who played most of his career with the Canterbury-Bankstown Bulldogs (1990 to 1998). The following season however, he and Canterbury-Bankstown won the 1995 ARL premiership grand final.

His brother, Mark Ryan, also played for the Canterbury club.

In the 1997 Super League season Ryan was selected to represent New South Wales on three occasions in the Super League Tri-series, scoring a try. That year he was also the Telstra premiership's leading try-scorer. Ryan later left Canterbury to play in the 1999 NRL season for the North Queensland Cowboys.

References

1969 births
Living people
Australian rugby league players
Canterbury-Bankstown Bulldogs players
Country New South Wales Origin rugby league team players
North Queensland Cowboys players
New South Wales rugby league team players
Rugby league fullbacks
Rugby league wingers
Rugby league centres
Rugby league players from New South Wales